Capuronianthus is a genus of flowering plants belonging to the family Meliaceae.

Its native range is Madagascar.

Species:

Capuronianthus mahafalensis 
Capuronianthus vohemarensis

References

Meliaceae
Meliaceae genera